Keiser University is a private university with its main campus in Fort Lauderdale, Florida and flagship residential campus in West Palm Beach, Florida. Additional branches are located in other parts of Florida and internationally. Keiser provides educational programs at the undergraduate, graduate, and doctorate levels in both traditional and online delivery formats. The school is institutionally accredited by the Southern Association of Colleges and Schools.

History 
In 1977, Arthur Keiser and his mother, Evelyn, created a career college called the Keiser School in Fort Lauderdale to prepare students for jobs in Florida's growing business and healthcare communities.  In 1982, with the addition of paralegal and computer programs, the school changed its name to the Keiser Institute of Technology. In 1986, the school began to award associate degrees and became Keiser College. In 2001, Keiser created its first bachelor's degree programs. Five years later, in 2006, the school made its final name change and became Keiser University.

In 2010, the Florida Attorney General began to investigate Keiser University and several other for-profit schools based in the state, but by 2012 the investigation was closed and Keiser entered into an "assurance of voluntary compliance". In 2011, the university switched from a for-profit to a not-for-profit model, when Arthur Keiser sold the institution for an undisclosed sum to Everglades College Inc., a non-profit entity founded by Keiser that also operates Everglades University.

In 2015, Keiser University added a 100-acre flagship residential campus in West Palm Beach, on the site of what was formerly Northwood University's Florida campus. The goal of this expansion was to help in providing students with a residential, traditional, educational experience in West Palm Beach, Florida. In 2016, the university launched the new college of Chiropractic Medicine, with Dr. Michael Wiles serving as the Dean. This is the first program of its kind started in South Florida.

In 2017, CEO and President Arthur Keiser, became chair of the U.S. Department of Education's National Advisory Committee on Institutional Quality and Integrity (NACIQI). Keiser was first appointed by then Secretary of Education Margaret Spellings and reappointed twice by Republicans.

Licensure and accreditation 
Keiser University is accredited by the Commission on Colleges of the Southern Association of Colleges and Schools to award certificates and degrees at the associate, baccalaureate, master's and doctoral levels. Keiser University is licensed by the Commission for Independent Education in  Florida.

Recognition and rankings 
 In 2021, U.S. News & World Report ranked Keiser University #284 (tie) out of all national universities and #11 (tie) in "Top Performers of Social Mobility."
In 2020, U.S. News & World Report ranked Keiser University #272 (tie) out of all national universities and #34 (tie) in "Top Performers of Social Mobility."
 In 2019, Washington Monthly ranked Keiser University 263rd out of 395 schools on its national universities list. This ranking is based on three broad categories: social mobility, research, and promoting public service.
 In 2018, Money magazine rated Keiser University - Fort Lauderdale at #8 in top colleges for the money in Florida.

Athletics 

The Keiser athletic teams are called the Seahawks. The university is a member of the National Association of Intercollegiate Athletics (NAIA), primarily competing in the Sun Conference (formerly known as the Florida Sun Conference (FSC) until after the 2007–08 school year) since the 2015–16 academic year. Prior to July 2015, the Seahawks represented Northwood University's West Palm Beach campus.

Keiser competes in 26 intercollegiate varsity sports: Men's sports include baseball, basketball, cross country, football, golf, lacrosse, soccer, swimming, tennis, track & field (indoor and outdoor) and wrestling; while women's sports include basketball, cross country, flag football, golf, lacrosse, soccer, softball, swimming, tennis, track & field (indoor and outdoor) and volleyball; and co-ed sports include eSports and spirit squad. Club sports include equestrian and fishing.

Basketball

Basketball was started in the 2006–2007 season, after the hiring of Rollie Massimino in 2005, as Director of Basketball Operations for both men's and women's basketball. Per ESPN, on December 14, 2016, Massimino, Keiser University's men's basketball coach, became the third active coach to achieve 800 career wins and the ninth coach overall. Massimino was 82 years old at the time.

Golf

The Seahawks Women's golf team have won four NAIA Women's Golf National Championships (2003, 2015, 2016, 2021). In 2022, the Seahawks Men's golf team won their first NAIA Men's Golf National Championship, while also having their first individual golf national champion.

Swimming

The Keiser Men's Swim team won the NAIA Men's Swimming National Championship three consecutive years in 2018, 2019, and 2020. With the 2021 championships canceled due to the COVID-19 pandemic, they would follow up by winning their fourth straight national title in 2022. In 2022, the Keiser Women's Swim team won their first NAIA Women's Swimming National Championship.

Football

In 2016, Keiser announced its plan to add football to its slate of varsity athletic programs, beginning during the 2018–19 academic year. In 2021, the Seahawks football team advanced to the NAIA quarterfinals for the second straight year, ending the season as the No. 7 ranked team in the nation.

Wrestling

In 2018, Keiser announced that the inaugural men's wrestling season will begin during the 2019–20 academic year. Keiser, along with Southeastern University and St. Thomas University (2020), are the current institutions that sponsor scholarship wrestling programs in Florida.

Soccer

Both the Seahawks Men's and Women's soccer teams have won national championships. The Women's soccer team won back-to-back national championships in 2019 and 2020. The Men's soccer team collected its first national championship in 2021.

See also
 Keiser University-Latin American Campus
 Keiser University – College of Golf

References

External links 
 
 Official athletics website

 
Private universities and colleges in Florida
Universities and colleges in Broward County, Florida
Universities and colleges in Jacksonville, Florida
Universities and colleges in Lakeland, Florida
Universities and colleges in Miami-Dade County, Florida
Universities and colleges in Orlando, Florida
Universities and colleges in Palm Beach County, Florida
Universities and colleges in Volusia County, Florida
Education in Brevard County, Florida
Education in Fort Lauderdale, Florida
Education in Lee County, Florida
Education in Sarasota County, Florida
Education in St. Lucie County, Florida
Daytona Beach, Florida
Melbourne, Florida
Port St. Lucie, Florida
Education in Sarasota, Florida
Former for-profit universities and colleges in the United States
Educational institutions established in 1977
1977 establishments in Florida
Chiropractic schools in the United States